Blackmail is the act of threatening to reveal potentially incriminating information about a person or group unless a specific demand is met.

Blackmailer, Blackmailed or Blackmail may also refer to:

Films, TV episodes and plays
Blackmail (1920 film), American silent drama directed by Dallas M. Fitzgerald
Blackmailed (1920 film), German silent crime drama
Blackmail (play), 1928 British thriller by Charles Bennett 
Blackmail (1929 film), British adaptation of Bennett's play, directed by Alfred Hitchcock
Blackmailer (1936 film), American thriller directed by Gordon Wiles
Blackmailer (1937 film), Czechoslovakian drama directed by Ladislav Brom 
Blackmail (1939 film), American crime drama starring Edward G. Robinson
Blackmail (1947 film), American crime noir
Blackmailed (1951 film), British drama directed by Marc Allegret
Blackmail (1973 film), Indian Bollywood thriller directed by Vijay Anand
Black Mail (1985 film), Indian Malayalam drama directed by Crossbelt Mani
Blackmail (1991 film), American TV film for USA Network, starring Susan Blakely
Blackmail (2005 film), Indian Hindi-language action thriller directed by Anil Devgan
Blackmail (webisodes), 2009 spin-off series of The Office mini-episodes
"Blackmail" (Law & Order), 2010 episode of NBC legal drama, Law & Order
Blackmail (2018 film), Indian Hindi-language black comedy directed by Abhinay Deo

Music
"Blackmail", 1975 song by 10cc from album The Original Soundtrack
Blackmail (band), German alternative rock performers active since 1993
Blackmail (album), 1994–1997 debut recordings of above band

Other 
Emotional blackmail, a form of psychological manipulation
Blackmailers (band), a Russian rhythm and blues band from Vladimir